SM City Rosales is a shopping mall owned by SM Prime Holdings located along MacArthur Highway in barangay Carmen East, Rosales, Pangasinan. It opened on November 28, 2008, and is the first SM Supermall in the province of Pangasinan and in Ilocos Region.

Typhoon Parma devastation
On October 8, 2009, the mall was not spared from Typhoon Pepeng as floodwaters entered the ground level of the mall. Merchandise and fixtures owned by the mall's anchor stores and tenants were swept away by the raging flood caused by torrential rains brought by the typhoon. Around 1,000 people, including a pregnant woman, were stranded inside the mall complex. The mall's rooftop became a drop-off point for the rescue workers that were deployed to bring relief goods to the affected residents in the nearby areas.

Barely two months after being devastated, the shopping mall re-opened to the public on November 27, 2009.

Transportation
The mall contains a Public Transport Terminal, with vans, jeepney, and tricycle service to nearby areas. It also serves as a bus stop  for inter-provincial bus lines.

References

Shopping malls in Pangasinan
Shopping malls established in 2008
SM Prime